The 2019–20 Liga IV was the 78th season of the Liga IV, the fourth tier of the Romanian football league system. The champions of each county association play against one from a neighboring county in a playoff to gain promotion. This had to be the third season when the counties were divided into 7 regions, each consisting of 6 counties and the draw was made on 15 February 2019, with 4 months before the first matches. 

In the spring of 2020, most of the county leagues were suspended due to the COVID-19 pandemic. On 11 May 2020, the Romanian Football Federation announced that the promotion format will be changed, especially due to the fact that no team (apart from the teams that were already excluded or dissolved) relegated from Liga III. The promotion play-off system was changed from 21 two-legged matches in 14 groups of 3 teams, the winners of the groups and the best 7 ranked runners-up will be promoted to the third tier, 14 teams instead of 21. The groups will be played on neutral ground.

County leagues

North–East
 Bacău (BC)
 Botoșani (BT)
 Iași (IS)
 Neamț (NT)
 Suceava (SV)
 Vaslui (VS)

North–West
 Bihor (BH)
 Bistrița-Năsăud (BN)
 Cluj (CJ)
 Maramureș (MM)
 Satu Mare (SM)
 Sălaj (SJ)

Center
 Alba (AB)
 Brașov (BV)
 Covasna (CV)
 Harghita (HR)
 Mureș (MS)
 Sibiu (SB)

West
 Arad (AR)
 Caraș-Severin (CS)
 Gorj (GJ)
 Hunedoara (HD)
 Mehedinți (MH)
 Timiș (TM)

South–West
 Argeș (AG)
 Dâmbovița (DB)
 Dolj (DJ)
 Olt (OT)
 Teleorman (TR)
 Vâlcea (VL)

South
 Bucharest (B)
 Călărași (CL)
 Giurgiu (GR)
 Ialomița (IL)
 Ilfov (IF)
 Prahova (PH)

South–East
 Brăila (BR)
 Buzău (BZ)
 Constanța (CT)
 Galați (GL)
 Tulcea (TL)
 Vrancea (VN)

2019–2020 Promotion play-off
The matches are scheduled to be played in July or August 2020.

Region 1 (North–East)

Group A

Group B

Region 2 (North–West)

Group A

Group B

Region 3 (Center)

Group A

Group B

Region 4 (West)

Group A

Group B

Region 5 (South–West)

Group A

Group B

Region 6 (South)

Group A

Group B

Region 7 (South–East)

Group A

Group B

Possible promotion
At the end of the promotion tournament, a special table was made between 2nd places from the 14 groups. The first 7 teams in this table were also promoted in the Liga III.

See also
 2019–20 Liga I
 2019–20 Liga II
 2019–20 Liga III

References

External links
 FRF

Liga IV seasons
4
Romania
Liga IV